Alan Arkin is an actor and comedian of the stage and screen. 

He has received various awards including an Academy Award, a BAFTA Award, a Golden Globe Award, two SAG Awards, and a Tony Award.

He received the Academy Award for Best Supporting Actor and BAFTA Award for Best Supporting Actor for his comedic role as the elderly irascible grandfather in the independent comedy Little Miss Sunshine (2006). He received Academy Award nominations for The Russians Are Coming, the Russians Are Coming (1966), The Heart is a Lonely Hunter (1968), and Argo (2012). He received the Golden Globe Award for Best Actor – Motion Picture Musical or Comedy for his role in the Norman Jewison comedy The Russians Are Coming, the Russians Are Coming (1966). He received two Screen Actors Guild Award for Outstanding Performance by a Cast in a Motion Picture along with the ensembles of Little Miss Sunshine (2006), and Argo (2012).

For his work on television he has received six Primetime Emmy Award nominations, including two nominations for Outstanding Supporting Actor in a Comedy Series for The Kominsky Method (2018-present). He also received four Screen Actors Guild Award nominations, and two Golden Globe Award nominations for his role in the series. For his work on the Broadway stage he received the Tony Award for Best Featured Actor in a Play for Enter Laughing in 1963 and was nominated for the Tony Award for Best Direction of a Play for The Sunshine Boys in 1973.

Main associations

Academy Awards

BAFTA Awards

Emmy Awards

Golden Globe Awards

Screen Actors Guild Awards

Tony Awards

Critics awards

Miscellaneous awards

References 

Lists of awards received by American actor